Humane Society International (HSI) is the international division of The Humane Society of the United States. Founded in 1991, HSI has expanded The HSUS's activities into Central and South America, Africa, and Asia. HSI's Asian, Australian, Canadian, and European offices carry out field activities and programs.

Activities
Humane Society International (HSI) claims to address issues such as inhumane practices and conditions affecting companion and farm animals, illegal wildlife trade, threats to  endangered species, slaughter of marine mammals, the use of animals in research and testing, the suffering of animals for the fur trade. HSI works with national and jurisdictional governments, humane organizations, and individual animal protectionists in over 50 countries worldwide to find practical, culturally sensitive, and long-term solutions to common animal problems and to inculcate an ethic of respect and compassion for all life.

Methods
Humane Society International (HSI) cooperates with policymakers on international treaties and free trade agreements to conduct briefings and to help draft legislation, regulations, policy statements, and resolutions affecting animals. HSI supports the efforts of governments, industries and NGOs to promote the protection of animals through trade capacity building projects in developing countries and international campaigns to reduce suffering caused by exploitation of marine mammals, factory farming, the fur trade, trophy hunting, toxicology and research testing, and animal fighting and cruelty.

HSI is a regular and active participant in meetings of international bodies such as the International Whaling Commission, the Convention on International Trade in Endangered Species, and the International Union for Conservation of Nature, and enjoys Category I A General Consultative Status with the United Nations.

Global offices
Humane Society International (HSI) is the largest animal protection organisation in the world with over 12 million supporters globally. They have offices in the United States, Canada, Central America, United Kingdom and Europe, South Korea, Australia, South Africa and special conservation projects in many other countries.

Australia
Humane Society International Australia was established in May 1994 to support conservation and animal protection efforts in Australia and the Asia Pacific region. With over 40,000 Australian supporters and a number of significant achievements, HSI is now a major NGO influence for advocating positive change for environmental management and animal protection.

HSI works with national and state governments, conservation NGOs, animal welfare organisations, scientists and individuals to find practical, culturally sensitive, and long-term solutions to common environmental and animal protection problems.

HSI Australia has a particular emphasis on the following areas:

 a small grants program for environment and wildlife protection programs across Asia, Africa and India (and domestically);
 disaster relief support in developing countries to rescue stricken and abandoned animals and wildlife;
 the “Humane Choice” food label to improve the lives of farm animals and address the unsustainable practice of intensive farming;
 habitat protection in Australia with the Wildlife Land Trust Australia, a network of wildlife sanctuaries around Australia (including a legislative habitat nomination program);
 national and international marine campaigns against whaling, and seeking greater protection for sharks, turtles, seals, albatrosses and threatened fish species.
 climate change, and the protection of ‘carbon sinks' such as rainforests and areas of high biodiversity value
 national and international biodiversity policy and implementation to protect habitats critical to the survival of many native species;

Awards 

In 2012 the HSI awarded Marcelle Meredith, Executive Director of the National Council of Societies for the Prevention of Cruelty to Animals - South Africa (NSPCA), with the Award for Extraordinary Commitment and Achievement. The award is to recognize an individual animal protectionist (particularly those from developing countries) whose hard work and compassion have led him or her to exceptional levels of bravery and self-sacrifice in striving to mitigate and prevent the suffering of animals from neglect, cruelty and exploitation. In the past 25 years, Marcelle Meredith has achieved countless advancements in the protection of farm, wild and companion animals in South Africa and surrounding countries, creating model examples and laws for others to follow.

References

External links

Humane Society International on YouTube
Facebook page

International
Criticisms of bullfighting